SK Nusle is a Czech football club located in the district of Nusle in the city of Prague. Founded in 1903, it is one of the oldest clubs in the country. It is one of two clubs from the area to have played in the nation's top division of football, the other being Nuselský SK.

The club played in the Czechoslovak First League, the top flight of Czechoslovak football, in the 1942–43 season and the 1943–44 season.

Historical names 
 1903: SK Nusle
 1948: Sokol (Jawa) Nusle
 1953: Spartak Praha Nusle Závody 9.května
 1957: Spartak Jawa Nusle
 1968: SK Nusle

References

Football clubs in the Czech Republic
Association football clubs established in 1901
Czechoslovak First League clubs
Football clubs in Prague